The Lada Largus is a compact estate car built by the Russian manufacturer AvtoVAZ since 2012. It is essentially a rebadged version of the Renault-developed first generation Dacia Logan MCV and is produced as a joint project with Renault and Nissan.

History

After the Lada Riva had been removed from production in December 2010 AvtoVAZ no longer produced any inexpensive and roomy station wagon models. The present model line station wagons Lada Kalina and Lada Priora have a higher completion and much higher price. The Largus is the first joint project between AvtoVAZ and Renault-Nissan (with an investment of $550 million). It is part of a larger common plan of the companies to produce five models in Russia, based on the Dacia B0 platform. The total production in 2012 is expected to reach 27,000 cars (mostly Largus).

The Largus is being produced in a full-cycle production unit. It is equipped with air conditioning, an anti-lock braking system, 2 frontal airbags, 5 or 7 seats, bluetooth hands free and an MP3 player. It is available in two versions: as a passenger MPV and as a high-capacity panel van. Both versions are available with either of the two petrol engine options: a 1.6-litre 8 valve 84 hp or a 1.6-litre 16 valve, capable of producing . They are associated with a five-speed manual gearbox. The only significant changes from the original model are the grille, front bumper, lining the quarter panel and the headlights.

On 4 April 2012, AvtoVAZ launched Lada Largus production at a ceremony attended by Vladimir Putin. During his visit to Tolyatti, Putin toured the plant and signed the first Lada Largus. Sales were started on 16 July 2012. The panel van version went on sale in August 2012 and the Cross version was launched in 2015.

Facelift

In 2021, an updated Largus was introduced in two passenger versions called the Universal and the Cross, while the van version was renamed the Furgon.

Special variants
Lada sells wheelchair vans or various special bodies (refrigerated trucks, workshop vehicles, medical services (Stretcher Transport (ambulette) and ambulance versions), taxis and social taxis based on the Largus.

See also
Lada Granta
Dacia Logan
Lada XRAY
Dacia B0 platform
Nissan Almera

References

External links

Official Lada Largus Universal website
Official Lada Largus Cross website

Lada vehicles
Cars introduced in 2012
Cars of Russia
2010s cars
Front-wheel-drive vehicles
Compact MPVs
Vans
Production electric cars